Self-mentoring is a process which requires one to assemble a realistic, accurate assessment of yourself (strengths and weaknesses) with the goal of crafting one's ‘ideal self’ to heighten job performance, career progression, or personal ambitions. This practice is a four-stage framework which includes: self-awareness, self-development, self-reflection, and self-monitoring.

While self-mentoring moves to the forefront as a useful self-improvement practice, it has established a noteworthy presence. This has been shown in isolation or in combination with mentoring and/or coaching methods. It may not serve everyone, but it does serve the majority of individuals who are motivated to take control and lead using a common sense approach to self-leadership. Self-mentoring draws on organizational skills that we all recognize yet often forget we possess until needed. Self-mentoring builds confidence in one's ability to lead. After all, it is one's life; one should lead!

Self-Mentoring Steps
There are ten major steps aligned to each of the four levels of self-mentoring. Here is a chart listing the steps involved. At times, these steps may overlap among the four levels.

Here is a description to accompany each step in the process of self-mentoring.

Level 1: Self-Awareness

STEP 1:  Talents and Challenges
Recognize and identify talents and challenges in one's environment, the people in one's environment, and YOURSELF.

STEP 2: Expectations
Identify an expectation after compiling a list of potential options. Write down the expectation, so others can understand it if they read it.

Level 2: Self-Development

STEP 3: Strategy
Once one have one's expectation, develop a measurable strategy(s). A strategy is an activity that can be used to gather data.

STEP 4: Measuring
The strategy must be measurable either quantitatively, qualitatively or through a mixture of both. One may count for frequency or observe for behaviors.

STEP 5: Timing is Everything
Establish a timeline to collect data. Include a starting and ending date.  Plan each day or week as one implement the strategy. Collect data until one reach the end of one's timeline.

STEP 6:  Collecting
Collect data from one's activities. It may be one watching a video and taking notes, or a comparison of one's notes with one's colleagues’ feedback of the same video.

Level 3: Self-Reflection

STEP 7:  Reaching Out
Consider an internal and external networking team. Reach out to experts in the field for advice, and/or just a few trusting peers for feedback and reflection time.

STEP 8:  Making Sense of Everything
Once data is collected and feedback is available, reflect on what the data is saying. What does it mean?

Level 4: Self-Monitoring

STEP 9:  Reflection Time
Reflect upon what one have learned and apply it to the situation to test one's solutions. Did it work? Why or why not?

STEP 10: Keep Your Eye on the Ball
Monitor one's accomplishment. Develop a periodic status check. Consider starting a new expectation and repeating the process.

Self-Mentoring: An Individual Process 
In self-mentoring, one initiate responsibility for self-development by allocating time and commitment navigating one's surroundings and organizing an environment where one lead personal and professional growth. Self-mentors identify and develop individual skills that align with internal and external resources to meet expectations using social and professional networks when needed. Leadership is a process, not an innate or taught set of skills. Lambert, a scholar in leadership development, reveals supervision to include problem solving, broad-based and skillful participation, co-worker collaboration, and on-task performance. Those who aspire leadership positions need a structured approach to reach their full leadership potential.

Assimilating employees into an organization is a critical role for leaders. Commitment from the employees as well as the supervisor is equally important. In 1999, Oakes, Quartz, Ryan, and Lipton stated, and it still holds true today, that unless there is commitment by those involved in change and growth, reigning behaviors will return. Self-mentors are devoted and passionate in sustaining their success. A sense of accomplishment is motivational enough for them to continue their endeavor and maintain personal empowerment and self-efficacy. Beckford (2012) agrees with the influence of self-mentoring to one’s position of personal power and ownership.

Self-mentoring strengthens the existing culture in an organization. Barth (1999) views leadership as everyone’s work. Leaders grow when engaged with others to make sense of the world, reach out to new hires, commit to shared results, and develop identities as owners of their system - the organization. Self-mentoring provides a framework to welcome new employees, while also offering leadership opportunities to seasoned workers ready to step into supervisory roles. These positions may include administrative roles, responsibilities serving new employees, or a change in career direction.

The Beginning of Self-Mentoring
The benefits of using methods in self-mentoring when acclimating to new positions are abundant. This is especially true in the university setting. Academic professions are often self-directed within the domains of performance guidelines, review procedures, and promotion decisions employed by the university. Research suggests there is heightened self-esteem and self-efficacy with the application of self-mentoring practices. This, in turn, enhances connection and commitment to the institution.

To understand ways an individual can adapt to and apply self-mentoring skills, the following personal example illustrates this process. This case involves an instructor in higher education.

The detailed concept of self-mentoring (with all 4 levels embedded) was born as a result of a superintendent's adversities transitioning into higher education position. She found her new work at a university overwhelming as a disconnect persisted between her and her assigned mentor. While her mentor was more than proficient in ability and expertise, their mentor/mentee relationship struggled and wasn’t serving its purpose. Through the complexity of this experience, self-mentoring evolved as a tool the faculty member clung to and crafted in order to survive her new role.

In developing the process of self-mentoring, the new employee drew upon her innate as well as learned leadership skills and competencies. She established a plan for survival that involved setting expectations, forming strategies, gathering and analyzing data, networking, and monitoring progress. Pleased with her success at the end her first year, she continued her job and more importantly began sharing her methods she fittingly named, ‘self-mentoring’. The basic tenet leading this concept is ‘You are your own best mentor’. Kimberly Horn (2013) explains there will always be times in one’s career when the right mentor-mentee match simply doesn’t happen. This is when self-mentoring becomes the perfect option for acclimating to the change(s) and growing personally and professionally as a result.

For this retired superintendent, the shift into a role of university practitioner was met with obstacles she surmounted through the process of self-mentoring. After the creation and follow-through of this practice, this professor was honored with three prestigious academic awards. Self-mentoring has now moved beyond the field of education and impacted weight loss programs, student leadership, mentoring, and executive coaching experiences.

A Support Model
Coaching, mentoring, and self-mentoring have parallel, yet exclusive characteristics. Each system or combination of systems has value for establishments. An organization is a living, breathing, and ever-changing system of interlocked subcultures. Individuals immersed in a new environment require skills to navigate through what can be treacherous waters.  This system is a network of interdependent components that work together to accomplish the goals of an organization, and individuals must grasp the system they are surrounded by in order to perform appropriately in it. They must identify explicit or implied expectations from the environment. This can be challenging for even the most experienced. Coaching, mentoring, and self-mentoring support individuals navigating within this environment, while each has a unique approach that must be aligned with the needs of the individual and the organization. Central to all three of these practices is the idea of self-development. Each practice advocates for the personal and/or professional development of an individual.

References 

Barth, R. S. (2001). Teacher leader. Phi Delta Kappan, 82(6).

Beckford, A. (April, 2012). Self-Mentoring: An Idea for the Twenty-First Century. http://theinvisiblementor.com/2012/03/26/self-mentoring-an-idea-for-the-twenty-first-century/

Beckford, A. (2015). Mentoring yourself to success: Thoughts from educator Marsha Carr. The Invisible Mentor. Retrieved from http://theinvisiblementor.com/mentoring-yourself-to-success-thoughts-educator-marsha-carr/

Bond, N. & Hargreaves, A. (2014). The power of teacher leaders: Their roles, influences, & impact. Kappa Delta Phi in partnership with New York, NY: Routledge, Taylor, & Francis Group.

Carr, M. L. (2015). Self-Mentoring: The invisible leader. Middletown, DE: Edu-Tell, LLC.

Fullan, M. (2001). The new meaning of educational change. New York: Teachers College Press.

Horn, K. (2013, January 28). The increasing importance of self-mentoring [Web log post]. Retrieved from https://web.archive.org/web/20160517063901/http://publichealth.gwu.edu/blogs/researchaccelerator/2013/01/28/the-increasing-importance-of-self-mentoring/

Huang, C. & Lynch, J. (1995). Mentoring: The TAO of giving and receiving wisdom.  New York, NY: HarperCollins Publishers, Inc.

Lambert, L. (2003). Leadership redefined: An evocative context for teacher leadership. School Leadership & Management, 23(4), 421-430.

Lezotte, L. W., & McKee, K. M. (2002). Assembly required: A continuous school improvement system. Effective Schools Products.

Marshall, C., & Rossman, G. B. (2010). Designing qualitative research (5th ed.). Thousand Oaks, CA: Sage.

Schein, E. H. (2010). Organizational culture and leadership (Vol. 2). John Wiley & Sons.

Kaelin, Ray (2011) "Discover Your Inner Mentor" by Ray Kaelin, TKG LLC 2009.
https://www.the-self-mentoring-series.com
https://www.smashwords.com/profile/view/raykaelin

Self